Yellow Ukraine or Zhovty Klyn (Yellow Wedge) is a historical territory with significant Ukrainian settlement in Volga Region.

The settlement of Zhovty Klyn (the Yellow Wedge) started soon after the Pereiaslav agreement as the eastern border of the second Zasechnaya Cherta. Named after the yellow color of steppes on the middle and lower Volga, these colonies co-existed with the Volga Cossacks; colonists primarily settled around the city of Saratov. In addition to Ukrainians, Volga Germans and Mordovians migrated to Zhovty Klyn in numbers.  most of the population is mixed in the region, though a few "pure" Ukrainian villages remain.

See also
Green Ukraine
Grey Ukraine
Volga Germans

References

External links

Map showing location of Yellow Ukraine
Siry klyn Ukrainian community portal

Ukrainian diaspora in Russia
Saratov Oblast
Astrakhan Governorate
Cultural regions